Dasht-e Murt may refer to:
Dasht-e Murt-e Olya, a village in Qalkhani Rural District, Gahvareh District, Dalahu County, Kermanshah Province, Iran. 
Dasht-e Murt-e Sofla, a village in Qalkhani Rural District, Gahvareh District, Dalahu County, Kermanshah Province, Iran